Graffiti  is writing or drawings scribbled, scratched, or sprayed on a wall or other surface in a public place.

Graffiti may also refer to:

Books and publications
Graffiti, a series of books by author Nigel Rees
Graffiti (magazine), a Canadian music magazine in the 1980s
Graffiti (newspaper), an arts and entertainment publication in West Virginia

Music

Albums
Graffiti (Tokio album), 1998
Graffiti (Chris Brown album), 2009
Graffiti Bridge (album), a 1990 Prince album

Songs
"Graffiti" (Maxïmo Park song), 2005
"Graffiti" (Gackt song), 2011
"Graffiti", Spanish version of hit single from Demis Roussos discography

Aviation
FUL MA 30 Graffiti, a German ultralight trike design
Raisner Graffiti, an American ultralight trike design

Computing and technology
Graffiti (Palm OS), a handwriting recognition software used in PDAs
Graffiti (program), a computer program used in the fields of mathematics and chemistry
Graffiti Markup Language, a format that stores graffiti motion data
Yahoo! Graffiti, a multiplayer word game on Yahoo! Games

Other uses
Graffiti Junktion, a chain of restaurants located throughout Florida
Moviment Graffitti, a Maltese leftist pressure group
 Graffiti Awards, Uruguayan music awards established in 2003
 Graffiti Bridge (film), a 1990 film starring Prince

See also

Grafite (born 1979), Brazilian footballer
Graffito (disambiguation)